Events from the year 1731 in Russia

Incumbents
 Monarch – Anna

Events

 Pacific Fleet (Russia)

Births

Deaths

References

1731 in Russia
Years of the 18th century in the Russian Empire